KS4 or KS-4 may refer to:

 Kansas's 4th congressional district
 K-4 (Kansas highway)
 Key Stage 4 in the UK education system.